Keng Po-Hsuan (born 15 October 1984) is a Taiwanese baseball player who competed for the Chinese Taipei national baseball team in the 2004 Summer Olympics and the 2006 and 2009 World Baseball Classic.

References

1984 births
Asian Games medalists in baseball
Baseball players at the 2004 Summer Olympics
Baseball players at the 2006 Asian Games
Living people
Olympic baseball players of Taiwan
Baseball players from Taipei
Asian Games gold medalists for Chinese Taipei
Medalists at the 2006 Asian Games